Petasites spurius is a species of flowering plant in the family Asteraceae.

spurius
Taxa named by Ludwig Reichenbach